Justin Grennan is an American singer who is originally from Enumclaw, Washington, and now resides in Glendale, California. He appeared on NBC's The Voice in 2011.

Career 
Around 2006, Grennan met the producer Dallas Kruse and they collaborated and recorded Grennan's first album, Things I Should Have Said, in 2008. Since then, they have formed The Project, a five piece soul band which includes  Jorgen Ingmar (drums), Mikey Hachey (bass guitar), Justin Burrow (guitar) and Dallas Kruse (Hammond organ).

Participation on The Voice 
Grennan was the only male on Christina Aguilera's team on the 2011 season of The Voice. He was chosen for Aguilera's team after singing "Drops of Jupiter" in his blind audition; he was eliminated in the next round.

After The Voice was shown on NBC, Grennan did TV appearances, gigs, tours, radio interviews and recorded his second album at ZionStudios in Orange County, California.

References 

American soul singers
The Voice (franchise) contestants
Living people
American rhythm and blues singers
21st-century American singers
21st-century American male singers
Year of birth missing (living people)